Meiacanthus oualanensis, the canary fangblenny, is a blenny from the Western Central Pacific where it is only known from Fiji.  This species grows to a length of  SL.

References

oualanensis
Fish of Oceania
Fish of the Pacific Ocean
Fish described in 1880
Taxa named by Albert Günther